Mystus is a genus of fish in the family Bagridae native to Asia. Phylogenetic relationships within this genus are poorly understood, though it has been suggested that there are two major lineages.

Species
There are currently 46 recognized species in this genus:
 Mystus abbreviatus (Valenciennes, 1840)
 Mystus alasensis H. H. Ng & Hadiaty, 2005 
 Mystus albolineatus T. R. Roberts, 1994
 Mystus ankutta Pethiyagoda, N. K. A. Silva & Maduwage, 2008
 Mystus armatus (F. Day, 1865) 
 Mystus atrifasciatus Fowler, 1937
 Mystus bimaculatus (Volz, 1904)
 Mystus bleekeri (F. Day, 1877)
 Mystus bocourti (Bleeker, 1864)
 Mystus canarensis S. Grant, 1999
 Mystus carcio (F. Hamilton, 1822) 
 Mystus castaneus H. H. Ng, 2002 
 Mystus catapogon Plamoottil, 2016 
 Mystus cavasius (F. Hamilton, 1822) 
 Mystus cineraceus H. H. Ng & Kottelat, 2009
 Mystus dibrugarensis (B. L. Chaudhuri, 1913) 
 Mystus falcarius Chakrabarty & H. H. Ng, 2005 
 Mystus gulio (F. Hamilton, 1822)
 Mystus heoki Plamoottil & Abraham, 2013 
 Mystus horai Jayaram, 1954 
 Mystus impluviatus H. H. Ng, 2003
 Mystus indicus Plamoottil & Abraham, 2013 
 Mystus irulu Vijayakrishnan and Praveenraj. 2022
 Mystus keletius (Valenciennes, 1840)
 Mystus keralai Plamoottil, 2014  (Kerala Mystus)
 Mystus leucophasis (Blyth, 1860)
 Mystus malabaricus (Jerdon, 1849)
 Mystus menoni   Plamoottil, 2013  (Idukki Mystus)
 Mystus montanus (Jerdon, 1849)
 Mystus multiradiatus T. R. Roberts, 1992
 Mystus mysticetus T. R. Roberts, 1992
 Mystus nanus Sudasinghe, Pethiyagoda, Maduwage & Meegaskumbura, 2016 
 Mystus ngasep Darshan, Vishwanath, Mahanta & Barat, 2011 
 Mystus nigriceps (Valenciennes, 1840) 
 Mystus oculatus (Valenciennes, 1840)
 Mystus pelusius (Solander, 1794)
Mystus prabani  
 Mystus pulcher (B. L. Chaudhuri, 1911)
 Mystus punctifer H. H. Ng, Wirjoatmodjo & Hadiaty, 2001
 Mystus rhegma Fowler, 1935
 Mystus rufescens (Vinciguerra, 1890)
 Mystus seengtee (Sykes, 1839)
 Mystus singaringan (Bleeker, 1846)
 Mystus tengara (F. Hamilton, 1822) 
 Mystus velifer H. H. Ng, 2012 
 Mystus vittatus (Bloch, 1794) 
 Mystus wolffii (Bleeker, 1851)
 Mystus zeylanicus H. H. Ng & Pethiyagoda, 2013

References

Bagridae
Freshwater fish genera
Taxa named by Giovanni Antonio Scopoli
Catfish genera